The 1996 Stanley Cup Finals was the championship series of the National Hockey League's (NHL) 1995–96 season, and the culmination of the 1996 Stanley Cup playoffs. It was contested by the  Western Conference champion Colorado Avalanche and the Eastern Conference champion Florida Panthers, two teams in the Finals for the first time. Colorado defeated Florida in a four-game sweep to win their first Stanley Cup becoming the seventh post-1967 expansion team and the second former WHA team (after the Edmonton Oilers) to win the Cup. Colorado's Joe Sakic earned the Conn Smythe Trophy as MVP of the 1996 Playoffs.

It was Colorado's first appearance in the Finals, in only their first season in Denver since moving from Quebec City (where they had formerly played as the Nordiques) in 1995. It was also Florida's first appearance in the Finals, in only the franchise's third season since entering the NHL in 1993. This was also the first time since the formation of the NHL in 1917 that the two teams competing for the Cup were making their first Finals appearance.

Paths to the Finals

Colorado defeated the Vancouver Canucks, Chicago Blackhawks, and Detroit Red Wings in six games each to advance to the Finals.

Florida defeated the Boston Bruins in five games, the Philadelphia Flyers in six, and the Pittsburgh Penguins in seven.

Game summaries

Game one

The series opened on June 4, at the McNichols Sports Arena in Denver.  Patrick Roy was in goal for Colorado, and John Vanbiesbrouck was between the pipes for Florida (a rematch from the 1986 Wales Conference Finals when Roy was with the Montreal Canadiens and Vanbiesbrouck was with the New York Rangers). Although Colorado was the heavy favorite in the series, Florida got on the board first on Tom Fitzgerald's goal at 16:51 of the first period. That would be all the Panthers would get, however, as Colorado scored three times within five minutes in the second period. Scott Young scored at 10:32, Mike Ricci scored at 12:21, and Uwe Krupp scored at 14:21. The Avalanche went on to win the game 3–1, with Roy making 25 saves in the victory.

Game two

Peter Forsberg got the Avalanche on the board first in game two, scoring an unassisted goal at 4:11 of the first period. The Panthers tied the game on Stu Barnes' power-play goal at 7:52. Rene Corbet broke the 1–1 tie with a power-play goal at 10:43, and then Forsberg scored two power-play goals of his own at 13:46 and 15:05 to complete the hat trick. Colorado led 4–1 after just one period. The Avalanche would make it 5–1 with Corbet's second goal of the game at 4:37 of the second period. Valeri Kamensky followed with a goal just 31 seconds later, and Jon Klemm scored at 10:03 to give Colorado a dominating 7–1 lead after two periods. Klemm would add another goal at 17:28 of the third period. It was the Avalanche's fourth power-play goal of the game. Colorado won the game 8–1, with three players scoring at least twice.

Game three

The Avalanche went to the Miami Arena in Florida with a 2–0 series lead. Claude Lemieux, back after his two-game suspension, scored the first goal of the game at 2:44 of the first period to give Colorado a 1–0 lead. Florida played determinedly, however, and tied the game on Ray Sheppard's power-play goal at 9:14. Rob Niedermayer scored at 11:19 to give the Panthers their second lead of the series. The score was 2–1 Florida after one period. At 1:38 of the second period, Colorado's Mike Keane scored a game-tying goal. Captain Joe Sakic scored the go-ahead goal just 82 seconds later, and Colorado went on to win 3–2 and take a commanding three-games-to-none lead in the series. Patrick Roy made 32 saves in the win.

Game four

With their backs to the wall, the Panthers played a defensive game. Florida goaltender John Vanbiesbrouck went save for save with Colorado goaltender Patrick Roy. The two teams played a marathon game that took until the third overtime period. Uwe Krupp's unassisted goal at 4:31 ended 44 minutes and 31 seconds of overtime and gave the Avalanche a 1–0 win and a four-game series sweep. Goaltender Patrick Roy stopped all 63 shots he faced. Colorado outscored Florida 15–4 in the series, and Patrick Roy stopped 147 of 151 shots, for a save percentage of .974. Joe Sakic was awarded the Conn Smythe Trophy as playoff MVP, having led all skaters in goals with 18, and points with 34. For both Patrick Roy and Claude Lemieux, it was one of their three Stanley Cup wins in 11 years. Roy and Lemieux first won the Cup in 1986 with the Montreal Canadiens. Roy won a second Cup with Montreal in 1993. Lemieux won a second cup with New Jersey in 1995.

The Avalanche became the third team to win the cup after relocating: the  Calgary Flames won the Cup after moving from Atlanta and the New Jersey Devils in 1995 won the Cup 13 years after they played their last game in the same city and same arena that the Avs played in as the Colorado Rockies.

Team rosters
Bolded years under Finals appearance indicates year won Stanley Cup.

Colorado Avalanche

Florida Panthers

Stanley Cup engraving
The 1996 Stanley Cup was presented to Avalanche captain Joe Sakic by NHL Commissioner Gary Bettman following the Avalanche's 1–0 triple overtime win over the Panthers in game four.

The following Avalanche players and staff had their names engraved on the Stanley Cup

1995–96 Colorado Avalanche

Note:
Sandis Ozolinsh was first Latvian born and trained player to win the Stanley Cup. 
Uwe Krupp was first the German born and trained player to win the Stanley Cup.

Stanley Cup engravings 
Adam Deadmarsh's name was misspelled ADAM DEADMARCH. This mistake was corrected by stamping an "S" over the "C" twice. Deadmarsh's name was the first player's name to be corrected on the Presentation Stanley Cup.

Broadcasting
In Canada, the series was televised on CBC. In the United States, this was the second year that coverage was split between Fox and ESPN. Fox broadcast games 1 and 3 while ESPN televised games 2 and 4. The Stanley Cup-clinching game thus aired on cable. Had the series extended, Fox would have televised games 5 and 7, and ESPN would have aired game 6.

See also
 1995–96 NHL season
List of Stanley Cup champions

References
 
 

 
Stanley Cup
Colorado Avalanche games
Florida Panthers games
Stanley Cup Finals
Sports competitions in Miami
1990s in Miami
June 1996 sports events in the United States
1990s in Denver
Sports competitions in Denver
1996 in sports in Florida
1996 in sports in Colorado